Lost Christmas is a 2011 British drama written by David Logan and John Hay and directed by John Hay. It stars Eddie Izzard, Jason Flemyng and Larry Mills. The BBC film, set in Manchester over two Christmases, shows a group of people who are brought together by a mysterious drifter who helps them find what they have lost. It was released on DVD on 5 November 2012.

Synopsis
'Goose' is a 10-year-old boy who on Christmas Eve hides his fireman father's car keys in the hope that he won't leave when called to an emergency rescue. But his mother gets her keys and drives his dad to work, and ten minutes later they are killed in a car crash.

Flash forward a year and it's Christmas Eve once again; we see Goose is no longer the bright, energetic ten-year-old boy he once was, and is now a streetwise kid who is supporting his Nan through petty crime. Enter 'Anthony', a mysterious man who appears, seemingly out of nowhere, on Manchester's snowy streets. 'Anthony' has no recollection of who he is, where he came from nor where he's supposed to go but he seems to know things. He can find things that are lost and make lives whole again.

Everything starts with a lost bangle. This is where 'Anthony' discovers his ability to see what has happened to a person prior to losing what they seek and how they've lost what they desire. He touches a person's hand and sees in his mind their story leading up to the loss of what they are seeking. Despite being lost himself, he has the compulsion and ability to find the lost, uncovering truths that will eventually transform the life of 'Goose' and those affected by his decision. But is 'Anthony's' ability to heal real, or just an illusion?

Cast

 Eddie Izzard as Anthony
 Larry Mills as Goose
 Jason Flemyng as Frank
 Connie Hyde as Linda
 Brett Fancy as Paul
 Sorcha Cusack as Nan
 Adlyn Ross as Lal
 Dwayne Scantlebury as Tagger
 Christine Bottomley as Helen
 Steven Mackintosh as Henry
 Chloe Newsome as Alice
 Geoffrey Palmer as Dr. Clarence
 Jason Watkins as Noel Noble
 Jessie Clayton as Jemma
 Stephen Aintree as Antiques Expert
 Libbi Rubens as Milly
 Robert Lonsdale as unnamed police constable

Songs
"Wonderful Christmastime" written by Paul McCartney performed by Tom McRae was used in the original TV version, but not the DVD
"Perfect Christmas" composed for Audio Network by Gledden, Pedder and Dymond, performed by David Ward Maclean

See also
Programmes set in Manchester

References

External links

"Lost Christmas Review" at Life of Wylie

2011 in British television
2011 television films
2011 films
2010s Christmas drama films
BBC television dramas
British Christmas drama films
British drama television films
Christmas television films
Films set in Manchester
Films shot in Greater Manchester